Sten Magnus Wassén (1 September 1920 – 23 June 2014) was a Swedish sailor who competed in the 1952 Summer Olympics.  Together with his elder brother Folke he won a bronze medal as crew member of the Swedish boat Hojwa in the 5.5 metre class event.

References

External links
 
 
 
 

1920 births
2014 deaths
Swedish male sailors (sport)
Olympic sailors of Sweden
Olympic bronze medalists for Sweden
Olympic medalists in sailing
Sailors at the 1952 Summer Olympics – 5.5 Metre
Medalists at the 1952 Summer Olympics
Royal Gothenburg Yacht Club sailors
People from Partille Municipality
Sportspeople from Västra Götaland County
20th-century Swedish people